Jonesville is a hamlet in Saratoga County, New York, United States.

History
Jonesville is named after John Jones, the "first collector of the town of Half-Moon"—The area was part of the town of Halfmoon until 1828.

Points of interest
 Jonesville Cemetery is listed on the New York State and National Register of Historic Places.
 Jonesville Store is a former country store listed on the National Register of Historic Places.

Notes

Hamlets in Saratoga County, New York
Hamlets in New York (state)